James Oscarson (born in 1957 in Ogden, Utah) is an American politician, and member of the Republican Party. He was a  member of the Nevada Assembly from February 4, 2013 to November 7, 2018 representing District 36.

Education
Oscarson attended the Clark County Community College.

Elections
2012 When Republican Assemblyman Ed Goedhart retired and left the District 36 seat open, Oscarson won the four-way June 12, 2012 Republican Primary with 1,618 votes (41.34%), and won the November 6, 2012 General election with 14,539 votes (64.45%) against Democratic nominee Anthony Wernicke. Oscarson lost the June 12, 2018 Republican primary election to Dennis Hof, who died before the general election.

References

External links
Official page at the Nevada Legislature
Campaign site
 

1957 births
Living people
Republican Party members of the Nevada Assembly
People from Pahrump, Nevada
Politicians from Ogden, Utah
College of Southern Nevada alumni
21st-century American politicians